The Great Swindle can refer to:

The Great Swindle (1941 film), American mystery 
The Great Swindle (1971 film), Italian thriller
The Great Swindle (2013 novel), translation of French novel Au revoir là-haut

Related names include:
The Great Rock 'n' Roll Swindle
The Great Rock 'n' Roll Swindle (album)
The Great Rock 'n' Roll Swindle (song)
The Great Global Warming Swindle
The Great Salad Oil Swindle
Great Reality TV Swindle
The Great Gold Swindle
The Great Mint Swindle
The Last Great Country Swindle
The Great Rocksteady Swindle
Great Hog Swindle